Robert Keith may refer to:

Robert Keith (actor) (1898–1966), American actor
Robert Keith (historian) (1681–1757), Scottish Episcopal bishop and historian
Robert II Keith, Marischal of Scotland (died 1332), who fought at the Battle of Bannockburn
 Robert III Keith, Marischal of Scotland (died 1346), Scottish nobleman
Robert Murray Keith (died 1774), British diplomat
Robert Murray Keith (the younger) (1730–1795), his son, British soldier, diplomat and politician
Robert William Keith (1787–1846), English musical composer and writer
 Robert Alba Keith, better known as Brian Keith
Robert J. Keith, company vice-president and writer on the history of marketing